Isaac Blessing Jacob is an oil on canvas painting by Matthias Stom, created c. 1635, whilst the artist was on Sicily. It is now in the Barber Institute of Fine Arts, which purchased it in 1994. The sniffing dog indicates the work can also be read as an allegory of the five senses.

The work was exhibited at a 1999-2000 exhibition, the first retrospective on the artist.

References

Paintings depicting Jacob
1635 paintings
Paintings in the collection of the Barber Institute of Fine Arts
Paintings by Matthias Stom
Dogs in art